The State Trading Organization Plc (MSE:STO ) or STO is a public company with 81.63% of the shares owned by the Maldivian Government with the rest 18.37% being held by the public after the IPO a couple of years ago. The company is controlled by a board of directors headed by a Chairman.

Outlets

STO People's Choice - On 15th March 2022, Vice President of Maldives, Hon. Faisal Naseem opened the newly refurbished STO People's Choice. The one-stop superstore is ideal and convenient for customers who are looking for home appliances, ACs, TVs and supermart products. The store includes a pharmacy as well. In addition, to support SMEs, the company has leased space from the store to third party vendors which include stationaries, toys, mobile phones and gadgets.

STO Staple Foods - Since the establishment of STO in the mid 60s, it has been selling staple foods.

STO Medical Services - STO Medicals Services play an important role in providing high quality pharmaceuticals and medical items to the consumers and our corporate clients at affordable prices.STO Pharmacy has holds a wide array of Essential Drugs or Prescription Drugs. Located at the OPD wing of the Indhira Gandhi Memorial Hospital, STO Pharmacy has become a reliable and trusted pharmacist.
STO Medical Services holds the main stores of pharmaceuticals and is responsible to supply the Pharmacy and a number of other Corporate Clients which include the IGMH, the Regional Hospitals and a number of other Chemists and Pharmacists in Malé and other islands.

STO Construction - Established in 1988, deals with construction materials such as cement, river sand, deformed bars, plywood, timber, and roofing materials. It also functions as the main distributor of locally packed international standard cement and roofing sheets with the aide of its subsidiaries Maldives Marine Cement and Maldives Structural Products.

STO Fuel and Lubricants - Operated from Funadhoo island and Dhoonidhoo island (Malé Atoll) deals with the supply and sale of a wide variety of petroleum products. In January 2001, Fuel and Lubricants diversified as a joint venture between Fuel Supplies Maldives Pvt. Ltd. (FSM) Plc. and Vara Maldives. Pvt. Ltd. to further extend their distribution network to the entire Maldives.

STO Agricenter -STO Agricenter was opened on 12th April 2021 with the aim of providing 100% authentic Agricultural products produced by Maldivian farmers to our retail and wholesale customers. 
Our main objective of Agricenter is to ensure food security. Strongly advocating CSR with primary stakeholders and forming local partnerships to support & improve capacity of farmers and Agri business. To contribute to a sustainable and stabilize agriculture industry. Constantly providing farmers with a fair price after continuous consulting with stakeholders & farmers referring to fluctuating market figures. There are over 300 farmers registered in Agricenter. 

STO Thoddoo Agricenter -Thoddoo Agricenter was opened on 20.10.2021. AA. Thoddoo consists of many farmers who mass produce agricultural products. Hence, the farmers of Thoddoo can remain in their own island and be able to sell their produce directly at the Agricenter. The main objective is to market the product to the nearby resorts and supply them to Male’ and nearby islands to sell.

STO Makita Showroom -STO Makita Showroom was opened on 27th July 2022 at Sea Tracs Building. The one-stop showroom specifically opened for Makita Tools and its after sales services will ensure the customers get the best offers on the world renown power tool brand.

Services
STO specializes in both retail and wholesale businesses involving selling goods directly to end customers for personal use and providing quality products to wholesale customers at competitive prices.

The company has its branches in the following islands (locations) nationwide:

 Eydhafushi (STO 132 No. Fihaara)
 Fonadhoo (STO 134 No. Fihaara)
 Fuvammulah (STO 136 No. Fihaara)
 Gan (STO 141 No. Theyo Fihaara)
 Hithadhoo (STO 137 No Fihaara)
 Hoarafushi (STO 122 No. Fihaara)
 Maradhoo-Feydhoo (STO 159 No. Fihaara)
 Thinadhoo (STO 138 No. Fihaara)
 Hulhumeedhoo (STO 164 No. Fihaara)
 Kulhudhuffushi (STO 165 No. Fihaara)

STO established its credit scheme service in 1995 with the purpose of enabling all government employees to purchase goods from STO on installment basis.

Subsidiaries

Allied Insurance Company Maldives Pvt Ltd - Allied Insurance Company of the Maldives was established in 1985 as a joint venture company between State Trading Organization and Commercial Union Assurance Company of the United Kingdom. In its early years, the State Trading Organization bought back the shares and the company continued operations with local ownership and management. Allied has had tremendous growth over the past 20 years, both in terms of the volume of business and profitability.

Fuel Supplies Maldives Pvt Ltd (FSM) - Fuel Supplies Maldives Pvt Ltd was established on January 1, 2001. FSM was founded as part of the scheme of STO to choose private companies to form partnerships in specialized lines of services.

Maldive Gas Pvt Ltd - Maldive Gas, natural gas distribution market, delivering cooking gas to over 40,000 customers throughout the Maldives.

Maldives Structural Products Pvt. Ltd (MSP) - Maldives Structural Products Pvt. Ltd (MSP) is a joint venture company of State Trading Organization PLC & Rainbow Enterprises Pvt. Ltd., formed with the main objective of producing steel roofing products and related accessories and supply to the Maldives market.

Maldives National Oil Company Ltd. (MNOC) - The Maldives National Oil Company Ltd. (MNOC) was incorporated by the Government of the Republic of Maldives to complement the Government's effort to diversify the national economy and thereby generate employment and foreign income through oil and gas exploration and production in the territory of the Maldives and abroad.

Raysut Maldives Cement Pvt Ltd - With the rapid development of tourism in the country, the Government of Maldives embarked on the development of harbors, airports, housing and other infrastructure. The tourism industry continued to grow with local and foreign investment and large projects began to get off the ground. All these projects escalated the price of cement in the Maldives and led to the partnership between STO and Marine Cement Limited (a Swiss-based cement company owned by Lafarge of France and Blue Circle of United Kingdom) to form Maldives Island Marine Cement pvt ltd. The company was renamed Lafarge Maldives Cement pvt ltd in 2011, and with the 2020 acquisition of all foreign-held shares of the company by Raysut Cement Company of Oman, it became Raysut Maldives Cement pvt ltd.

Maldives Industrial Fisheries Co. Ltd. (MIFCO) - The Maldives Industrial Fisheries Company (MIFCO) was incorporated under the umbrella of the STO group during this year. The company is engaged in the processing and exportation of tuna, tuna products, reef fish and other fishery products. MIFCO's products are in increasing demand by discerning customers, especially in Europe due to its high quality.

The main activities of the Maldives Industrial Fisheries Company (MIFCO) are centered around the purchase, process and value addition of tuna and the subsequent sale and exportation of tuna, tuna products, reef fish and other fishery products. MIFCO's products are in increasing demand by discerning customers, especially in Europe due to its high quality as a result of exclusive pole-and-line skipjack fishery of the country complemented with the pristine waters of the Maldives.

Maldives State Shipping (MSS) - Maldives State Shipping was established in 2020 to serve all the traders in the Maldives for their imports and exports through MSS's liner services.

The company also creates employment opportunities for seafaring Maldivians. MSS is a wholly owned subsidiary of STO.

See also
 State trading enterprises

References

External links

Companies of the Maldives